The 2003 Western Carolina Catamounts team represented Western Carolina University as a member of the Southern Conference (SoCon) during the 2003 NCAA Division I-AA football season. The Catamounts were led by second-year head coach Kent Briggs and played their home games at Bob Waters Field at E. J. Whitmire Stadium in Cullowhee, North Carolina. Western Carolina compiled an overall record of 5–7 with a mark of 3–5 in conference play, tying for sixth place in the SoCon.

Schedule

References

Western Carolina
Western Carolina Catamounts football seasons
Western Carolina Catamounts football